St. Mary's Church is located at 12 Ross Rd, Stanley, Falkland Islands. It is the only pro-cathedral and parish of the Apostolic Prefecture of the Falkland Islands, an isolated territorial jurisdiction of the Catholic Church directly dependent on the Holy See.

It is the only Catholic church in the islands. It is made of wood and was consecrated in 1899. On the West wall it has oil murals, illustrated by British/Argentine artist James Peck, born in the islands.

In September 1966, the hijackers of Aerolíneas Argentinas Flight 648 were granted sanctuary in the church by Father Rodolfo Roel (of Dutch origin) whilst they awaited deportation back to Argentina for trial.

The day that Argentine President Juan Domingo Peron died on 1 July 1974, a mass was said in this church, attended by the British authorities of the islands and the Argentine state employees who worked at LADE, YPF and Gas del Estado was conducted including two Argentine teachers who taught Spanish language.

During the Falklands War in 1982, there was a significant increase in the number of liturgies, with mass being celebrated in English and Spanish.

See also
Catholic Church in the Falkland Islands

References

Roman Catholic churches in the Falkland Islands
Saint Mary
Saint Mary's Church, Falkland Islands
19th-century Roman Catholic church buildings in the United Kingdom